Elophila bourgognei is a species of moth in the family Crambidae. It is found in France.

The body and wings are white. Males have traces of a submarginal grey line, while the forewings of the females are almost completely white. The hindwings of the males have only weak traces of ante- and postmarginal lines. These lines are present in females. There is a brownish grey discocellular spot on the hindwings of both sexes.

References

Moths described in 2001
Acentropinae
Moths of Europe